Gav Cheshmeh (also Romanized as Gāv Cheshmeh) is a village in Harirud Rural District, Bujgan District, Torbat-e Jam County, Razavi Khorasan Province, Iran. At the 2006 census, its population was 127, in 29 families.

References 

Populated places in Torbat-e Jam County